"Take Me Now" is a song by American singer-songwriter David Gates. It is the title track of Gates' 1981 fifth solo album, and was the first of two singles released from the album.

Personnel
David Gates - guitar, bass
Larry Knechtel - piano
Paul Leim - drums

Chart performance
The song reached number 62 on the US Billboard Hot 100 and peaked at number 15 on the Adult Contemporary chart in October 1981.  It did best in Canada, where it spent two weeks at number nine on the Adult Contemporary chart.

Actualization of views
"Take Me Now" experienced a significant resurgence in popularity during the 2010s, having accrued more than 35 million views on YouTube as of October 20, 2019.

Chart performance

References

1981 songs
1981 singles
David Gates songs
Songs written by David Gates
Arista Records singles